Nisan Cumming Stewart (born 31 March 1974) is a noted drummer, record producer and songwriter. Having worked with Timbaland and Missy Elliott on Missy Elliott's earlier work (This Is Not a Test!), he co-produced Karen Clark Sheard's 2002 album 2nd Chance, and co-produced and co-wrote the Nelly Furtado single "No Hay Igual" (from her 2006 album Loose) with Timbaland. Stewart and Timbaland also co-wrote and produced a song on rapper Busta Rhymes's 2006 album The Big Bang.
He is currently the musical director for Jamie Foxx, and 50 Cent. He is the founder of the gospel music group The Soul Seekers.

Productions discography

References

Record producers from California
1974 births
Living people
Musicians from Los Angeles
Songwriters from California